Kushal Singh Dahiya or Bhai Kushal Singh Dahiya was a Jat from the village of Badhkhalsa in what is now Sonipat, Haryana, India. He offered his head in place of that of the Guru Tegh Bahadur, which was being taken to Anandpur Sahib by Bhai Jiwan Singh and which Mughals wanted to seize. Dahiya was thus killed for that purpose.

There is a memorial to Dahiya at Badhkhalsa Memorial Complex, Rai, in Sonipat.

See also
 Sikh sites in Haryana
 Khanda, Sonipat
 Brahma Sarovar
 Kapal Mochan
 Lohgarh, capital of Banda Singh Bahadur
 Pehowa
 Sadaura

References

Sikh martyrs
Sikh places